A list of films produced in Argentina in 1971:

External links and references
 Argentine films of 1971 at the Internet Movie Database

1971
Films
Argentine